Maimoon Palace or Maimun Palace is an istana (royal palace) of the Sultanate of Deli and a well-known landmark in Medan, the capital city of Northern Sumatra, Indonesia. Today, it serves as a museum. The name is the Arabic word for "blessing".

Built by Sultan Ma'mun Al Rashid Perkasa Alamyah in years 1887–1891, the palace was designed by the Dutch architect Theodoor van Erp and covers 2,772 m2 with a total of 30 rooms. The palace has become a popular tourist destination in the city, not solely because of its historical heritage status, but also because of its unique interior design of the palace, combining elements of Malay cultural heritage, Islamic and Indian architecture, with Spanish and Italian furniture and fittings.

It is the last surviving Melayu palace, the rest having been destroyed in the 1946 social revolution. Nearby British troops protected it.

Gallery

See also
List of colonial buildings in Medan

References

External links

Palaces in Indonesia
Buildings and structures in Medan
Cultural Properties of Indonesia in North Sumatra
Dutch colonial architecture in Indonesia
Royal residences in Indonesia
Tourist attractions in North Sumatra